Nantucket Range Lights could refer to any of three sets of range lights on Nantucket:

The earliest range was formed by the Nantucket Beacon and the Brant Point Light. 
The Nantucket Cliff Range Lights were first established in 1830 and then replaced with new towers on a slightly different site. These were discontinued in 1912.
The Nantucket Harbor Range Lights were established in 1908 and are still in service.